Jeeto Pakistan is a Pakistani game show, hosted by actor Fahad Mustafa on ARY Digital. The show was launched on 18 May 2014. It has been called the "biggest game show" of Pakistan. Jeeto Pakistan's participants are selected randomly from a studio audience, who require passes to attend the show.

Overview 

The show is divided into several segments, each one offering contestants prizes in return for achieving a set of challenges or game tasks given by the host. The prizes offered range from cars and motorcycles to gold, cash, vacation packages and household items. The show is funded by sponsors, advertisers and commercial brands.

Jeeto Pakistan is occasionally broadcast from other cities, with some shows having been held in Lahore, Islamabad, Faisalabad, Multan and Dubai.

During the month of Ramadan every year, the show runs a daily transmission in the evening.

Seasons Overview

Episodes
2014
2015
2016
2017
2018
2019
2020
2021
2022
2023

Cast

Main 
 Fahad Mustafa as Host (2014–present)

Recurring 
 Aadi Adeal Amjad as Salman (2020–present)
 Ahmad Shah and Umer Shah as Treasure Box Pirate/Candy Boy (2019–present)
 Adnan Siddiqui as Lahore Falcon's captain (2020–2022)
 Shoaib Malik as Multan Tiger's Captain (2021–22)
 Shaista Lodhi as Peshawar Stallion's captain (2020–22)
 Sana Javed as Islamabad Dragon's captain (2020–22)
 Ushna Shah as Karachi Lion's captain (2022)
 Aijaz Aslam as Quetta Knight's captain/Gujranwala Bulls captain (2021)/(2022)
 Sarfaraz Ahmed as Quetta Knight's captain (2020–22)
 Humayun Saeed as Karachi Lion's captain (2020–2021)
 Fabiha Sherazi as an assistant (2014–2017)

Special guest appearances 

 Aadi Adeal Amjad
 Adnan Siddiqui
 Agha Ali
 Ahmed Ali Butt
 Ahmad Shah
 Ahmed Shehzad
 Ahsan Khan
 Aijaz Aslam
 Aiman Khan
 Ali Rehman Khan
 Ali Safina
 Ali Zafar
 Amar Khan
 Amna Ilyas
 Areeba Habib
 Arez Ahmed
 Asad Shafiq
 Asad Siddiqui
 Asim Azhar
 Ayaz Samoo
 Ayesha Omar
 Ayeza Khan
 Babar Azam
 Behroze Sabzwari
 Bilal Abbas
 Bilal Ashraf
 Bushra Ansari
 Danish Taimoor
 Dur-e-Fishan Saleem
 Emmad Irfani
 Eshal Fayyaz
 Fahad Mirza
 Fahad Shaikh
 Faysal Qureshi
 Fatima Fahad
 Farhan Saeed
 Feroze Khan
 Goher Mumtaz
 Gohar Rasheed
 Hajra Yamin
 Hania Amir
 Hareem Farooq
 Hassan Ahmed
 Hiba Bukhari
 Hina Dilpazeer
 Hira Mani
 Humayun Saeed
 Imad Wasim
 Iman Ali
 Imran Ashraf
 Iqra Aziz
 Iqrar Ul Hassan
 Javed Sheikh
 Junaid Jamshed
 Junaid Khan
 Kamran Akmal
 Kinza Hashmi
 Kubra Khan
 Madiha Naqvi
 Mahenur Haider Khan
 Mahira Khan
 Mansha Pasha
 Mawra Hocane
 Maya Ali
 Mahnoor Baloch
 Mehwish Hayat
 Mikaal Zulfiqar
 Minal Khan 
 Moammar Rana 
 Mohib Mirza
 Mohsin Abbas Haider
 Momal Sheikh
 Muhammad Amir 
 Muhammad Faizan Sheikh 
 Muneeb Butt
 Mushk Kaleem
 Nabeel Zafar 
 Nadia Khan
 Naveen Waqar
 Nazish Jahangir
 Neelam Muneer 
 Nimra Khan
 Osman Khalid Butt
 Pehlaaj Hassan
 Rabia Butt
 Ramsha Khan
 Saba Qamar 
 Saboor Aly 
 Salahuddin Tunio
 Sami Khan 
 Sana Javed
 Sanam Jung
 Sanam Saeed
 Sarfaraz Ahmed
 Sarwat Gilani
 Shafaat Ali
 Shahid Afridi
 Shahood Alvi
 Shaista Lodhi
 Shakeel Siddiqui
 Shaniera Akram
 Sheheryar Munawar 
 Shehroz Sabzwari
 Shehzad Roy
 Shehzad Sheikh 
 Shoaib Akhtar 
 Shoaib Malik 
 Sohai Ali Abro
 Sonya Hussyn 
 Sumbul Iqbal 
 Sunita Marshall 
 Syed Jibran 
 Umar Akmal 
 Urwa Hocane 
 Ushna Shah
 Uzma Khan 
 Vasay Chaudhry 
 Wahab Riaz
 Waseem Badami 
 Wasim Akram
 Yasir Hussain 
 Yumna Zaidi
 Vaneeza Ahmad
 Zara Noor Abbas 
 Ahsan Khan
 Sadaf Kanwal

Jeeto Pakistan League 

In the Ramadan season of 2020, the show's format was changed in light of the coronavirus pandemic and the studio audience was eliminated. Instead, a "league"-based format was introduced where teams representing five major cities would compete against each other, with each team led by a notable celebrity. New contestants would be drawn for each episode while maintaining social distancing, and the top two teams with most points would qualify for a final play-off. Members of the public would be able to participate in the show through live calls.

In 2021, Multan Tigers was introduced as 6th team of Jeeto Pakistan League. Shoaib Malik was selected as the new team's captain. Sarfraz Ahmed was replaced by Ejaz Aslam as the captain of Quetta Knights team.

In 2022, Ushna Shah joined the league after replacing Humayun Saeed as Karachi lion’s captain. Sarfaraz Ahmed returned as the captain of Quetta knight and Ejaz Aslam was assigned a new team named gujranwala bulls.

Broadcast
 Pakistan | ARY Digital

See also 
 Croron Mein Khel

References

External links
 

2014 Pakistani television series debuts
ARY Digital original programming
Pakistani game shows
Television shows set in Karachi
Urdu-language television shows